The Flying Fish Festival is one of the traditional ceremonies of the Taiwanese indigenous Yami people, which live on a tiny island off the southeastern coast of Taiwan called Orchid Island.  The Flying Fish Festival comes from the legends of the Yami people and constitutes the social norms of their society.  During the festival period, the Yami people need to be very careful of their actions and words in order not to violate the norms.  In addition to the Yami's cultural heritage, the Flying Fish Festival also implies the respect for the natural environment and sustainable ecological perceptions.

Festival period 

The festival is divided into three seasons, which are called Rayon (the flying fish season), Teyteyka (the flying fish season ends, normally happens in summer or autumn) and Amiyan (there is no flying fish). Rayon, teyteka and Amiyan these flying fish seasons as mentioned are Ivatan languages as Taiwanese and Ivatan share almost the same culture and language due to their proximity that they even share and island called yami and orchid island with both ivatan (Philippines) and Taiwanese natives. The total festival will last around eight to nine months each year. Within the months, there will be various ceremonies happening throughout the season and all of the ceremonies are collectively known as Flying Fish Festival. With Kuroshio (black tide) happening between January to June and it brings a rich amount of migratory fish to Orchid Island, therefore, the festival starts around February or March and it continues till October. The festival includes different parts of ceremonies, such as giving the blessing to the boats, praying for bumper harvest of the year and first-fishing night ceremony. In addition, this is the reason why the Yami treasure the festival as they believe that the fishes are the gift from the god.  The dates of festivals are different between each tribe because seniors in each tribe will decide the date rather than following with the lunar calendar.

 The Flying Fish Festival season begins when Cheilopogon unicolor fish ('sosowon' in the Yami language) approach the island. The Yami will catch the fish using light to attract them at night. During April and May, there will be another kind of flying fish arrive, which called Cheilopogon spilonotopterus (‘papatawan’ in the Yami language).

Taboo 
Some of the Taboo that is restricted during the festival period are associated with the incoming and going of the flying fish. During the period of the Flying Fish Festival, there are things in numerous areas that are prohibited. 
 Regarding of eating the flying fish are different while in festival period. Guidelines on how to prepare the cuisines are also something to follow in the Yami's culture. The fish cannot cut into pieces, it must cook as a whole and cutting down the tail and pectoral fins are particularly prohibited. 
 There are norms to follow even when the first day of catching the fish. For instance, according to Youth Development Administration of Taiwan, "Sacred rites giving gratitude to caught fish must occur, or else the fish cannot be eaten—boils and sores will erupt. Fish dried upside-down cannot be eaten, even if later righted. Non-Yami are exempted from these rules, and can eat their fill without worry. Dried fish is an especially good accompaniment to alcohol. Those Yami specialties, prepared sweet potatoes and taro, are highly recommended to boost long-term memory." 
  The Yami people cannot eat fishes from other tribes, they can only exchange within their own tribe. Moreover, the Yami people have to eat raw fish eyes as soon as they caught the fishes in order to avoid the fishes to escape.

Museum 
 Lanyu Flying Fish Cultural Museum is located in Taitung County, Taiwan since 2005.

References 

Festivals in Taiwan